Doris Porter Caesar (November 8, 1892 – 1971) was an American sculptor best known for her portrayals of the nude female body.

Early life and education
Doris Porter Caesar was born in Brooklyn. Caesar attended Miss Chapin's School before transferring to the Spence School and the Art Students League, where she studied under George Bridgman. In 1913, she married and subsequently had three children.  In 1925 she studied under Alexander Archipenko, under whom she developed her expressionistic approach to representing the female body. Doris' first solo show occurred in 1931 at the Montross Gallery.

Work
Caesar experimented with sculpting the female body in clay, bronze, and brass, often elongating the figures to be taller than human height. In 1927, she cast her first bronze, the primary material she would work with throughout her career. She took this bronze to E. Weyhe, a dealer on Lexington Avenue in New York City, who gave her access to his collection of German Expressionist artists. There, she was inspired by Ernst Barlach, Wilhelm Lehmbruck, and Käthe Kollwitz, whose work led her to turn away from classical forms and begin distorting the figures she sculpted until they were "stick-like." Unfortunately, most of her work in the 1920s and 1930s was destroyed; the bulk of her major work was created in the following two decades after she moved to North Salem, New York and then to Litchfield, Connecticut, where she died in 1971. In an article published in Hill News (March 11, 1975), Caesar says that she chose sculpture "because it's big and fights against you all the time".

Major works

1947: Mother and Child
1950: Descent from the Cross
1955: Kneeling Torso
1957: Ascent

Exhibitions
1931: First solo exhibition at the Montross Gallery in New York City
1934: Solo exhibition at the Montross Gallery
1935: Solo exhibition at the E. Weyhe Bookshop and Gallery, New York City
1943: Exhibition by Curt Valentin, New York City
1957: Annual Exhibition, Whitney Museum, New York City
1959: "Four American Expressionists," Whitney Museum, New York City

References

External links
Doris Caesar Papers at Syracuse University
Doris Caesar Papers at Wichita State University
Chwiecko, Nancy. "Doris Caesar: Her Sculpture Fight." Hill News. March 11, 1976. Retrieved February 1, 2014.

1892 births
1971 deaths
Art Students League of New York alumni
American women sculptors
People from Brooklyn
Artists from Brooklyn
20th-century American sculptors
People from North Salem, New York
20th-century American women artists
Spence School alumni
Sculptors from New York (state)
Chapin School (Manhattan) alumni